USCGC Forsythia (WAGL-63/WLR-63), was a 114-foot, 230-ton buoy tender of the United States Coast Guard. She was built by Avondale Marine Ways of Westwego, Louisiana, and entered service in 1943. She was stationed at Sewickley, Pennsylvania until 1963, and then Memphis, Tennessee, until she was decommissioned in 1977.

References

Forsythia
Sycamore-class buoy tenders
1943 ships
Ships built in Bridge City, Louisiana